Tales of Amadou Koumba or Les Contes d'Amadou Koumba  is a collection of tales from Senegal, transcribed by Birago Diop from the accounts of his family's griot, Amadou Koumba. It was published for the first time in 1947.

This is one of the first significant attempts to put African oral literature into written form. According to Roland Colin, these tales reveal the finest art of the Wolof griots and Birago Diop makes these tales audible to the European reader and the least informed of the "Black African spirit".

Tales (in French titles)
"Fari l'ânesse"
"Un jugement"
"Les mamelles"
"N'Gor Niébé"
"Maman-Caïman"
"Les mauvaises compagnies I"
"Les mauvaises compagnies II"
"Les mauvaises compagnies III"
"Les mauvaises compagnies IV"
"La lance de l'hyène"
"Une commission"
"Le salaire"
"Tours de lièvre"
"Petit-mari"
"Vérité et mensonge"
"La biche et les deux chasseurs"
"Les calebasses de Kouss"
"L'héritage"
"Sarzan"

Editions
Paris, Fasquelle, coll. « Écrivains d'Outre-Mer », 1947 
Rééd. Paris/Dakar, Présence Africaine, 1960 
Rééd. Paris/Dakar, Présence Africaine, 1969

References

Senegalese literature
1947 books
African folklore
Collections of fairy tales
African fairy tales